The Scarlet Car is a lost 1923 American silent drama film directed by Stuart Paton and starring Herbert Rawlinson, Claire Adams, and Edward Cecil. It is based on a novel by Richard Harding Davis, which had previously been turned into a 1917 Lon Chaney film of the same title.

Plot
As described in a film magazine, Billy (Rawlinson) is fired after being arrested for speeding thirty times in thirty days, and is shipped home to his father Jim Winthrop (Tom McGuire). His father has backed Ernest Peabody (Cecil) for mayor. Ernest has betrayed Violet Gaynor (Johnson), Jim's secretary. Beatrice Forbes (Adams), whom Billy likes and would like Billy if she only knew it, has fallen for Ernest's grandiloquent line of bunk and promised to marry him. Violet has learned that Ernest has double-crossed Jim in politics about the time her father Jerry Gaynor (Robbins) has discovered her condition (pregnancy) and, believing Billy guilty of being the father, attempts to blackmail him and "queers" his relationship with Beatrice. Mitt Deagon (O'Brien), who loves Violet, also discovers her secret and attempts to expose Ernest, but is prevented by Billy, who is completely unaware of the facts. While campaigning, Ernest's car strikes Violet's father and, believing the man is dead, Ernest flees in a cowardly fashion. The election of Ernest Peabody seems certain and he announces his engagement to Beatrice. When Violet reads this, she does what any woman betrayed in love would do, and in a climax of fast events clears up the triangle. When Billy understands the character of Ernest, he decides to see to it that Ernest is neither elected mayor nor married to Beatrice.

Cast
 Herbert Rawlinson as Billy Winthrop 
 Claire Adams as Beatrice Forbes 
 Edward Cecil as Ernest Peabody 
 Norris Johnson as Violet Gaynor 
 Tom McGuire as Jim Winthrop 
 Marc B. Robbins as Jerry Gaynor
 Tom O'Brien as Mitt Deagon

References

Bibliography
 Palmer, Scott. British Film Actors' Credits, 1895 - 1987. McFarland, 1988.

External links

1923 films
1923 drama films
Silent American drama films
Films directed by Stuart Paton
American silent feature films
1920s English-language films
Universal Pictures films
Remakes of American films
American black-and-white films
1920s American films